Phú Mỹ is a ward in Phú Mỹ town, Bà Rịa–Vũng Tàu province.

The ward was formerly Phú Mỹ township, the capital of Tân Thành District. On April 12, 2018, Tân Thành District was dissolved to form the new district-level town of Phú Mỹ, the township became a ward of Phú Mỹ town.

References 

Populated places in Bà Rịa-Vũng Tàu province
Communes of Bà Rịa-Vũng Tàu province